Freeman Island is a small island in Suisun Bay, California. It is part of Solano County. It is also known as Holbrook Island. Freeman Island is a popular spot for fishing; in 2019, a 53-inch sturgeon was caught near the island.

References

Islands of the San Francisco Bay Area
Islands of Northern California
Islands of Solano County, California
Islands of Suisun Bay